Broscăuți is a commune in Botoșani County, Western Moldavia, Romania. It is composed of two villages, Broscăuți and Slobozia.

The commune had 3450 people at the 2002 census; of these, 99.9% were ethnic Romanians and 99.4% were Romanian Orthodox.  The main occupation of its inhabitants is agriculture—growing plants like corn and potatoes, raising animals (cows, sheep, rabbits) and birds (ducks, chicken). Some of the people of Broscăuți work in the factories in nearby Dorohoi, which provides them with some extra money. A significant part of the commune's youth has emigrated to countries such as Italy and Spain since the 1990s.

Notable natives
 Dimitrie Pompeiu (1873–1954), mathematician

References

Communes in Botoșani County
Localities in Western Moldavia